Recovery: Live! is a live album released by the American hard rock band Great White originally in 1988. Several versions of the album were released, with variations in both covers and track listings. The US version features five cover songs recorded direct-to-2-track in 1986, as well as five live songs from 1983. The CD release added the songs from the EP On Your Knees (re-issue of the original Out of the Night EP) as a bonus, though another version of the CD exists that lists the EP, but does not actually contain it. It only contains the ten songs found on the original vinyl LP, and has a different mastering than the 15-track disc. The ten track CD variation is the Columbia Record Club edition. The European release replaces tracks 6–10 with five songs from a 1987 Marquee show (the same show as disc two of the ...Twice Shy limited edition). The Japanese version is a strange hybrid and includes five tracks from the US version, two tracks from the Live at the Ritz promo CD, and five studio tracks from the Shot In The Dark and Once Bitten albums.

Track listing (US version) 
 "Immigrant Song"
 "Rock 'N Roll"
 "Money (That's What I Want)"
 "Red House"
 "I Don't Need No Doctor"
 "Hard and Cold"
 "Substitute"
 "Streetkiller"
 "Bad Boys"
 "Stick It"

Track listing (UK/European version) 
 "Immigrant Song"
 "Rock 'N Roll"
 "Money (That's What I Want)"
 "Red House"
 "I Don't Need No Doctor"
 "Shot in the Dark"
 "What Do You Do"
 "Gonna Getcha"
 "Money (That's What I Want)"
 "All Over Now"

Track listing (Japan version) 
 "Hard and Cold (US version)"
 "Substitute (US version)"
 "Streetkiller (US version)"
 "Money (That's What I Want) (US/UK version)"
 "Red House (US/UK version)"
 "Shot in the Dark (studio)"
 "Gonna Getcha (studio)"
 "Run Away (studio)"
 "Since I've Been Loving You (from "Live At The Ritz" promo CD)"
 "Face the Day (Extended Version) (from "Live At The Ritz" promo CD)"
 "All Over Now (studio)"
 "Rock Me (studio)"

Personnel 
 Jack Russell: lead vocals
 Mark Kendall: guitar, lead vocal on Red House
 Lorne Black: bass
 Audie Desbrow: drums
 Gary Holland: drums (1983 show)

Special guest 
 Michael Thompson: guitar on Red House

Charts

References 

Great White live albums
1988 live albums
Enigma Records live albums